Damaq (also known as Damagh) is a city and capital of Sardrud District, in Razan County, Hamadan Province, Iran. At the 2006 census, its population was 2,847, in 757 families.

References

Populated places in Razan County

Cities in Hamadan Province